Courier was built at Baltimore in 1812. The British captured her in 1813 and she became a British merchantman based in Jersey. She was wrecked in February 1819.

Career
Courier was built in Baltimore in 1812 and had been commissioned on 26 September 1812.

On 14 March 1813 HMS Andromache captured the Baltimore letter of marque Courier, off Nantes. Courier, Captain Robert Davis, was sailing back to Baltimore from Nantes. She arrived at Plymouth on 21 March.

Courier appeared in Lloyds Register (LR) in 1813 with Clements, master, LeQuesne, owner, and trade Plymouth–Jersey. She is described as a schooner, two years old, and an American prize.

Captain John Clement acquired a letter of marque on 27 July 1813.

Fate
She sank just outside the port. By cutting her masts and discharging part of her cargo she was later refloated and taken in to Jersey in a severely damaged condition. She had been on a voyage from Rio de Janeiro to Jersey; her sugar and coffee was totally spoilt. The Weymouth-Channel Islands packet  rescued the crew.

Citations

References
 
 

1812 ships
Ships built in Baltimore
Captured ships
Age of Sail merchant ships of England
Maritime incidents in 1819